Rilès Kacimi (born 4 January 1996) is French with Algerian nationality, from Rouen, Normandy. He is an artist, songwriter, composer and record producer. His songs are mainly written and performed in English, with some in Spanish.

Biography 
Born in France, Rilès started making music at a very early age by learning guitar and making YouTube covers. After obtaining a bachelor's degree, he decided to focus solely on music as a career. Rilès studied English literature at the University of Rouen while studying music on his own in his free time. He worked as a supervisor for a while to save up enough money and build his own home-studio in his bedroom. He then began to compose and write music independently. Rilès is also talented in arts. He sells his pieces of art as a way to make extra money for his music career. 
Rilès started his own music career by writing, producing, and mastering his own songs, as well as recording, directing and editing his music videos. This is reflected in his song lyrics where he references recording and producing his music independently.

He released his first album, Vanity Plus Mind (2015) and released a variety of singles such as “Brothers” which became a staple and one of his biggest hits in 2016. That same year he released one song per week, every Sunday, for a year to compile into his second “album” (more a collection of songs than an album) called “RILÈSUNDAYZ” which is made up of 52 songs. This includes songs “I Do it”, “Pesetas” and “Should I”, as some of the most popular songs. He organised in a concert tour in France in 2017 during which he performed at the Bataclan in Paris, twice, then at the Zenith of Rouen.

Discography

EPs
2015: Vanity Plus Mind
2020: LVL 36

Studio albums
2019: Welcome to the Jungle

Singles

References 

1996 births
Living people
Musicians from Rouen
French male singers
French rappers
French songwriters
Male songwriters
French people of Algerian descent